Sadda is a town in Sialkot District in the Punjab province of Pakistan. It is part of Marakiwal Union Council of Sialkot and is located at 32°34'60N 74°32'60E and has an altitude of 252 metres (830 feet).
Connected by both Saidpur Road and Faraz Shaheed (Gondal) Road it is approximately 5 km away (10 minutes drive) from Sialkot City.

References 

Cities and towns in Sialkot District